Gurkha Rifles may refer to several different regiments of Gurkhas:

Regiments of the British Indian Army 
 1st King George V's Own Gurkha Rifles (The Malaun Regiment) 
 2nd King Edward VII's Own Gurkha Rifles (The Sirmoor Rifles)
 3rd Queen Alexandra's Own Gurkha Rifles 
 4th Prince of Wales's Own Gurkha Rifles 
 5th Royal Gurkha Rifles (Frontier Force) 
 6th Queen Elizabeth's Own Gurkha Rifles 
 7th Duke of Edinburgh's Own Gurkha Rifles 
 10th Princess Mary's Own Gurkha Rifles 
 11th Gurkha Rifles 
 14th Gurkha Rifles 
 25th Gurkha Rifles 
 26th Gurkha Rifles 
 29th Gurkha Rifles  
 38th Gurkha Rifles  
 42nd Gurkha Rifles 
 44th Gurkha Rifles 
 56th Gurkha Rifles  
 710th Gurkha Rifles

Regiments of the Indian Army 
 1 Gorkha Rifles
 3 Gorkha Rifles
 4 Gorkha Rifles
 5 Gorkha Rifles
 8 Gorkha Rifles
 9 Gorkha Rifles
 11 Gorkha Rifles

Gurkhas